The Uruguay under 20 rugby team is the junior national rugby union team from Uruguay. They replace the two former age grade teams Under 19s and Under 21s. The team competed at the World Rugby Under 20 Championships and World Rugby Under 20 Trophy.

Uruguay qualified for the 2015 Under 20 Trophy after defeating Chile 22-12 in the South American Junior Rugby Championship.

Overall
Summary for all under 20 matches at the World Rugby Under 20 Championship and World Rugby Under 20 Trophy, including 2015:

Results

Current squad
Squad to 2015 World Rugby Under 20 Trophy.

Management
Juan Baldomir - Head Coach
Ricardo Martínez - Team Manager
Joaquín Pastore - Assistant Coach
Santiago Ramirez - Physiotherapist
Marcelo Santurio - Team Doctor
Florencia Orozco - Strength & Conditioning

Outstanding squad

2008 IRB Junior World Rugby Trophy: Champion

References

External links 
 Unión de Rugby del Uruguay - Official Site

under20
National under-20 rugby union teams